Air Commodore Jasjit Singh AVSM, VrC, VM (8 July 1934 – August 4, 2013) was an Indian military officer, writer, military strategist, and  air commodore in the Indian Air Force. He retired as Director of Operations of the Air Force but remained head of the Institute for Defence Studies and Analyses (1987-2001). He was founder-director of the Centre for Air Power Studies, based in Delhi. He was awarded the Vir Chakra during the Indo-Pakistani War of 1971.

Biography
Singh was born on 8 July 1934 He founded the Air Force think tank, Centre for Air Power Studies, and also remained longest continuously serving director of  Institute for Defence Studies and Analyses (IDSA) from 1987 to 2001.

In 2006, he was awarded the Padma Bhushan by Government of India.

Works

References

1934 births
2013 deaths
Indian Air Force officers
Indian military personnel of the Indo-Pakistani War of 1971
Military strategists
Military theorists
Indian military writers
Recipients of the Padma Bhushan in other fields
Recipients of the Vir Chakra